Aleksey Aleksandrovich Zhuravlyov (born 12 January 1980) is a Russian former professional football player.

Club career
He played 2 seasons in the Russian Football National League for FC Volga Ulyanovsk and FC Metallurg Lipetsk.

External links
 
 

1980 births
Living people
Russian footballers
Footballers from Brandenburg
Sportspeople from Potsdam
German people of Russian descent
Association football defenders
FC Khimik-Arsenal players
FC Ural Yekaterinburg players
FC Metallurg Lipetsk players
FC Arsenal Tula players
FC Nosta Novotroitsk players
FC Volga Ulyanovsk players